Ain (also Romanized as Ā'īn) is a village in Moallem Kalayeh Rural District, Rudbar-e Alamut District, Qazvin County, Qazvin Province, Iran. At the 2006 census, its population was 13, in 4 families.

References 

Populated places in Qazvin County